Corel AfterShot Pro is a commercial and proprietary raw image processing software by Corel. It is based on Bibble, which Corel acquired. It is notable among commercial raw software for offering a native and up to date Linux version. Version 2 was released on the March 21, 2014. Version 3 was released on the May 11, 2016.

Corel also offers a version for Windows and Mac without the "Pro" suffix, Corel AfterShot. Corel AfterShot is more limited, and does not include "Perfectly Clear Noise Removal" or HDR processing.

References

External links
Review by Digital Camera Review
Review by PC World

AfterShot Pro
Raster graphics editors
Raw image processing software
Proprietary cross-platform software